Ceorl may refer to any of the following:
 Ceorl, a rider of Rohan in J.R.R. Tolkien's fictional world of Middle-earth
 Churl, a social rank in Anglo-Saxon England, the lowest class of "free" men
 King Cearl of Mercia, Anglo-Saxon ruler in the early 7th century